Agaram  is a 2007 Indian Tamil-language action film written and directed by T. Nagarajan. It stars Nandha and Archana, with Biju Menon portraying the role of the antagonist, and Vivek, Seetha and Raj Kapoor among others in supporting roles. Despite being announced shortly after Nandha's debut in 2002, the film's release was delayed and eventually released on 16 February 2007, failing at the box office. The film's title is a reference to the first letter of the Tamil alphabet.

Plot
Thiru (Nandha) is a young Airtel employee who has just moved into the family's new house in Tuticorin with his sister (Varshini), mother (Seetha), and grandmother (Sukumari). Their happiness is tinged with the grief of Thiru's father's (Agathiyan) recent death, before the construction could be completed. Fate decrees that the entire family be placed in jeopardy when Thiru has an argument with Pasupathy, the brother of the dreaded don of the waterfront mafia, Varma (Biju Menon), during the local elections. Varma swears to kill Thiru, agreeing to spare his life for just four days until the election ends, at the request of his politician crony (Ilavarasu), who is all set to become the MLA. The family flees but is captured and brought back to face the atrocities unleashed by Varma's goons.

Cast

 Nandha as Thiru
 Archana as Preethi
 Biju Menon as Varma
 Vivek as Thiru's friend
 Ilavarasu as MLA
 Seetha as Thiru's mother
 Varshini as Thiru's sister
 Sukumari as Thiru's grandmother
 Ajay Rathnam as Police Commissioner
 Raj Kapoor as Police Deputy Superintendent
 Besant Ravi as Pasupathy
 Anamika
 Agathiyan as Thiru's father in a cameo role
 Sheetal Menon as an Item number

Production
Actress Hardeep was removed from the film in December 2004.

Soundtrack

The soundtrack and film score were composed by the noted composer Yuvan Shankar Raja. The soundtrack was released on 12 December 2005, nearly 14 months before the film's theatrical release. It has five tracks with lyrics written by Snehan.

Critical reception
Director Nagaraj in this action-thriller does justice to his work by retaining the momentum of the story. Nandha as the protagonist in the role of Thiru has managed his part well and proves himself versatile in both romantic and action scenes. The young actor, however, has to do much better in the time to come to make it big in the Tamil films.

Although, given scarcely any scene and a couple of duets, Hardeep Singh as the female lead, has done fairly well. Vivek fits well in the comedy part of the film. Biju Menon displays good histrionics as the villain. Agathiyan also proves to be a good actor appearing as Nandha's father. Yuvan Shankar Raja's music composition is fast-paced with catchy numbers.  Cinematographer Vetrivel has excelled in his camera work.

References

External links

 
 Review at Indiaglitz
 Review at NewsToday

Indian action films
2007 films
2007 action films
2000s Tamil-language films
Films involved in plagiarism controversies